Kalinjar is one of the 44 union councils, (administrative subdivisions), of Haripur District in the Khyber Pakhtunkhwa province of Pakistan. It is located to the north of the district capital Haripur and borders Mensehra and Abbottabad District area.

Health 
Rural Health Center (RHC) which was established in 2002, funded by Save the Children at Swabi Maira Chappar Darband Road Haripur.
Basic Health Unit (BHU), Kalinjar and veterinary dispensary Sawabi Mera are also there to help out.

Education 
Govt Tanawal  Degree College Gandaf situated at Moon Street Gandaf. The construction completed but classes not yet started due to some unknown political issues.
Govt Boys High School Kalinjar
Govt Girls Higher Secondary School Kalinjar. 
 Govt Middle school Swabi Maira.
 Govt Primary School Kalinjar No, 1 ,2 and 3.
Govt. Boys High School Kheri

Wildlife 
Game Reserve Kalinjar Contain 2000 ha area, Gray Goral, Black Partage, Gray Partage See-See Partage, Hare, Fox, Jackal are famous wildlife. Every year more than thousands of migrating birds come into this game Reserve.

Business 
Biryani is the most popular and successful business in kalinjar, mostly people engaged with it. They have shops across the Pakistan. There are several names of group like Al Naseeb Biryani, Al Naaz Biryani, Alnoorani Biryani, Student Biryani, Pak Ghazi Biryani, Sabir Biryani etc.
Other than that people are mostly daily wagers, do farming, shopkeepers and government servers (mostly Security forces, health department and teaching).

Problems of UC Kalinjar 
 Drinking water 
 Education 
 Health (Staff deficiency)
 Kalinjar to Jam bypass (Under construction)

Famous and attractive places in U/C Kalinjar 
Kani Kot Top
 Mari
 Swabi Maira Lake View Point
 Chajakka rest house
 Moon Street Gandaf
 Kheri Boys Higher Secondary School
 Kheri Forest " SEHRA" Top

Village names of Union Council Kalinjar
Kalinjar, Sawabi Mera, Gandaf, Marri, Khairi, Tawi Khanpur, Kani Kot,  Salabatt, Chajakka, Jam, Muradpur and many more small villages.

Famous Personalities 

HAJI KHUSHI MUHAMMAD AWAN

(Ex. UC Nazim Kalinjar(2002-2007),
MPA (Independent Candidate) in PK- 52,
Current PK- 40,
MNA Candidate from  Constituency NA - 19 & Current NA- 17.in 1987 & 1996 General Election. 

Muhammad Jaffar 

(Social Worker) Ex Chairman UC Kalinjar (The famous social worker of UC Kalinjar Muhammad Jaffar, Jaffar was also chairman of UC but the motives of His life is helping needy and poor persons free of cost. M Jaffar always speaking against mafia and supporting openly for area rights. 

*Malik Karamdad Khan(Political Figure) PML-N Candidate. 

*Sabir Awan (Businessman , political Worker)
Famous Biryani in Karachi
By Name Sabir Biryani

*Mumtaz Ahmed Awan(Brother Khushi Muhammad Awan) Businessman & Political Figure. 

Haji Habib Khan Ex. Vice President (PTI), Haripur.
Muhammad Jahffar Ex. Chairman (Social Worker).
Sardar Bahadar Abbasi (Ex. Councilor, Social Worker, President Tanawal welfare organization Coordination Committee, District Haripur)

Malik Riasat businessman(Naseeb biryani group), politician,social worker.

Ilyas Awan(Shopkeeper, Businessman) 

Mera:
Sajjad Shah
Sagheer Ahmed
Amjad Ali
Chanzeb

Sawabi:
 M. Illyas
 Abdul Waheed
 Akram

Gandaf:
 Haji Ikhlaq
 Jameel
 M. Rehman sir
 Azeem Ali shah
 zubair ali shah
Muradpur:
Ahmed Zaman (Social Worker)

Jam:
 M. Haris Abbasi
 Kaala Khan
 Peer Muhammad
 Azam
 Aurengzaib

Chajacka:
 Haji M. Fayaz

Kheri:
Jameel
Akhtar Zaman
Ibrar

Kanikot:
Khanvez
Chanzeb
Malik Rafeeq

References

Union councils of Haripur District